Gridlink is an American grindcore band, founded in 2004 in Hoboken, New Jersey. Their style can be described as technical grindcore with lyrical themes focused around abstract concepts and science fiction.

The band's song "Orphan", from their album also titled Orphan, was played sporadically as torture in the episode Blind Spot, of the Showtime television series, "Homeland".

Members
Jon Chang – vocals (Discordance Axis, Hayaino Daisuki, No One Knows What the Dead Think)
Takafumi Matsubara – guitar (Mortalized, Hayaino Daisuki)
Bryan Fajardo – drums
Mauro Cordoba – bass

Discography
 Amber Grey (2008), Hydra Head Records
 Orphan (2011), Hydra Head Records
 Longhena (2014), Handshake, Inc.
 Coronet Juniper (2023), Willowtip Records

References

External links

American grindcore musical groups
Musical groups established in 2004
Musical groups disestablished in 2014
Musical quartets
Heavy metal musical groups from New Jersey